The Church of the Immaculate Heart of Mary, popularly known as San Pancracio (Spanish for "Saint Pancras") is a Roman Catholic parish church in  Villa Muñoz, Montevideo, Uruguay.

Held by the Claretians, it is dedicated to the Immaculate Heart of Mary and also to Saint Pancras, patron saint of work and health. For this reason, this church has turned into a pilgrimage destination, with people attending the 12th day, every month of the year.

The parish was established on 30 January 1919.

References

1919 establishments in Uruguay

Roman Catholic church buildings in Montevideo
Claretian churches in Uruguay
20th-century Roman Catholic church buildings in Uruguay